Harkeyville is an unincorporated community in San Saba County, in the U.S. state of Texas. According to the Handbook of Texas, the community had a population of 12 in 2000.

History
The Harkey family founded Harkeyville on the banks of Wallace Creek in 1856. They purchased more land on which the community was built. The community was on the ballot to be the county seat when San Saba County was established but lost to San Saba. At one time, the community had several businesses, which included a general store, a blacksmith shop, a cotton gin, a grocery store, a barbershop, a dry goods store, a farm supply store, a millinery shop, a cattle auction, and a racetrack. Two of the Harkey children, Riley and Israel, operated a store here in 1904. The racetrack closed after a new one was built, and the cotton gin was demolished by a fire in 1920. When U.S. Route 190 bypassed Harkeyville in 1953, a majority of the business that survived the Great Depression eventually shut down. The cattle auction closed in the early 1970s. A community hall was built in 1973 and a Texas State Historical Marker was erected that next year. Its population rose from 30 in 1909 to 40 in 1949. It dropped to 12 from 1968 through 2000.

Riley and Israel Harkey were Indian scouts in Texas in 1850–53. Their entire family moved to this location from Arkansas and ranched in the area. Riley Harkey brought a mare to the area that attracted people to watch horse races. The community also had a baseball diamond. Even though there was no post office in the community, mail was delivered from a rural mail route.

An F1 tornado struck Harkeyville on January 20, 1973.

Geography

Education
Harkeyville had a school at one time. Martin and Jim Dixon donated a plot of land for a school in 1879, while Israel Harkey and his wife, Cansadie Gunter, did the same thing. It joined the San Saba Independent School District in 1929. The first school in the community was established by George W. Barnett on November 26, 1873, which was also used as a meetinghouse and church.

References

Unincorporated communities in San Saba County, Texas
Unincorporated communities in Texas